Lieutenant General Dr. Colin Royden Cockcroft , MBChB (4 October 1917 – 5 December 1987) was a South African military commander.

A medical doctor, he served as Surgeon General of the South African Medical Service from 1969 to 1977.

Early career

He obtained a MBChB degree from the University of the Witwatersrand in 1946 and later obtained a master's degree in pediatrics from the University of Pretoria

Military career

He joined the South African Army's medical corps in 1947 but later resigned in 1948.

He served in 5 & 7 Field Ambulance in the Citizen Force until he joined the Permanent Force in 1960.

He commanded 1 Military Hospital (Pretoria), served as Deputy Surgeon General and later commanded the centralised South African Medical Service, as Surgeon-General, from 1969 to 1977, before he retired

Awards and decorations 

 
 
 
 
 

He also served on the South African Medical and Dental Council and was a member of the South African Academy of Art and Science. on 1 December 1973 he was appointed the first Honorary Professor of Medicine at the University of Pretoria

References

1917 births
1987 deaths
20th-century South African physicians
South African military personnel of the Border War
South African people of British descent
University of the Witwatersrand alumni
University of Pretoria alumni